St. Hyacinthe was a federal electoral district in Quebec, Canada, that was represented in the House of Commons of Canada from 1867 to 1917.

It was created by the British North America Act, 1867. The electoral district was abolished in 1914 when it was merged into St. Hyacinthe—Rouville riding.

Members of Parliament

This riding elected the following Members of Parliament:

Election results

By-election: On Mr. Kierzkowski's death, 4 August 1870

By-election: On Mr. Bernier being appointed Controller of Inland Revenue, 22 June 1900

By-election: On Mr. Bernier being appointed Railway Commissioner, 19 January 1904

See also 

 List of Canadian federal electoral districts
 Past Canadian electoral districts

External links 
 Riding history from the Library of Parliament

Former federal electoral districts of Quebec